Idaho Legislative District 11 is one of 35 districts of the Idaho Legislature. It is currently represented by Patti Anne Lodge, Republican  of Huston, Scott Syme, Republican of Wilder, and Tammy Nichols, Republican of Nampa.

District profile (1992–2002) 
From 1992 to 2002, District 11 consisted of a portion of Canyon County.

District profile (2002–2012) 
From 2002 to 2012, District 11 consisted of all of Gem  and a portion of Canyon County.

District profile (2012–2022) 
District 11 currently consists of a portion of Canyon County.

District profile (2022–) 
In December 2022, District 11 will consist of a portion of Canyon County.

See also

 List of Idaho Senators
 List of Idaho State Representatives

References

External links
Idaho Legislative District Map (with members)
Idaho Legislature (official site)

11
Canyon County, Idaho